The Gambia made its Paralympic Games début at the 2012 Summer Paralympics in London, sending two wheelchair athletes to compete in track events. The country was initially due to send two athletes to the 2008 Summer Games, but withdrew before the Games began.

The Gambia has never taken part in the Winter Paralympic Games, and no Gambian athlete has ever won a Paralympic medal.

Full results for the Gambia at the Paralympics

See also
 The Gambia at the Olympics

References